Clément Marchand (12 September 1912 – 22 April 2013) was a Canadian writer, poet and journalist and publisher. He was born in Sainte-Geneviève-de-Batiscan, Quebec.

Awards
1939 - Prix Athanase-David 
1942 - Prix Athanase-David 
1947 - Member of the Royal Society of Canada
1981 - :fr:Grand prix littéraire de la Société Saint-Jean-Baptiste de la Mauricie
1984 - Member of the Ordre des francophones d'Amérique
2000 - Knight of the National Order of Quebec
Member of the Académie des lettres du Québec
Member of the Société des écrivains français

Selected works
Les Soirs rouges (1939)
Vanishing Villages: Tales from the Countryside (Guernica Editions, Canada, 1992).

Further reading
Lumley, Elizabeth. ''Canadian Who's Who 2002 (University of Toronto Press, 2002), p858.

References

1912 births
2013 deaths
20th-century Canadian poets
Canadian male poets
Journalists from Quebec
Writers from Quebec
Canadian poets in French
Canadian centenarians
Knights of the National Order of Quebec
20th-century Canadian male writers
Fellows of the Royal Society of Canada
Canadian male non-fiction writers
Men centenarians